Saurauia napaulensis is a small to medium tree. Leaves 20–35 cm by 6.5–12 cm, apex acuminate, base rounded, margins with fine teeth; 30-35 pairs of straight prominent veins. Flowers about 1.5 cm in diameter, pink, in branched axillary inflorescences. Fruit a globose berry, about 8 mm in diameter.

References

napaulensis
Trees of the Indian subcontinent
Trees of Indo-China
Trees of Peninsular Malaysia